The 11th Southeast Asia Basketball Association Championship was the qualifying tournament for the 2015 FIBA Asia Championship. It also served as a regional championship involving Southeast Asian basketball teams. It was held on 27 April to 1 May 2015 in Singapore. The three best teams at the end of the single round-robin tournament qualified for the 2015 FIBA Asia Championship which was held in Changsha, Hunan, China from 23 September to 3 October 2015.

As early as Day 4, the Philippines, Malaysia and tournament host Singapore have secured the three slots for the Asian Championships.

The Philippines, who sent an all-amateur team with one naturalized player in Marcus Douthit, won their seventh title of the tournament without losing a single game.

Venue
OCBC Arena in Kallang hosted all the games. The same venue was used for the 2015 Southeast Asian Games Basketball tournament a month later.

Rosters

Results

Awards

Final standings

Statistical leaders

Points

Rebounds

Assists

References 

 
2015
International basketball competitions hosted by Singapore
2014–15 in Asian basketball
2014–15 in Philippine basketball
2014–15 in Malaysian basketball
2014–15 in Indonesian basketball
2014–15 in Singaporean basketball
Bask
2015 in Laotian sport